C. sulcata may refer to:
 Coelolepis sulcata, a prehistoric jawless fish species from the Silurian
 Commelina sulcata, a synonym for Commelina erecta, the white mouth dayflower or slender dayflower, a perennial herb native throughout the Americas, Africa and western Asia

See also 
 Sulcata